Hassan El-Kasheef (born March 26, 1956) is a retired Sudanese athlete who competed in the sprints distances. He competed in the men's 400 metres at the 1984 Summer Olympics.

International competitions

References

External links

1956 births
Living people
Sudanese male sprinters
World Athletics Championships athletes for Sudan
Oregon State Beavers men's track and field athletes
African Games gold medalists for Sudan
African Games medalists in athletics (track and field)
Athletes (track and field) at the 1984 Summer Olympics
Olympic athletes of Sudan
Athletes (track and field) at the 1978 All-Africa Games